The Journey is a Baptist church located in St. Louis, Missouri. It is affiliated with the Southern Baptist Convention. Services are offered at multiple churches in St. Louis, including University City, Tower Grove, West County, and Bayless.

History 

The Journey was founded in 2001 by former lead pastor Darrin Patrick. Initial services were held in private residences and community centers. As attendance increased, the church formed a relationship with Hanley Road Baptist Church of Clayton and began operating out of its offices and having services within its sanctuary. In 2012, the two churches merged.

In 2006 the church bought the former Catholic church Holy Innocence on South Kingshighway in South St. Louis across from Tower Grove Park. This became their central campus. During this same time period, the church also began holding services in West St. Louis County at Missouri Baptist University. The Journey currently holds services at four locations in the St. Louis area. 

In February 2019, after seven years as a Journey church, The Journey Southern Illinois was equipped, resourced, and sent out to engage the community of southern Illinois as their own local church.

In 2022, the elders, staff leadership team, and former Senior Pastor Curtis Gilbert began pursuing and implementing many of the needed and desired structural changes, particularly ones that would move the needle toward the flourishing and empowering of each Journey church. This included decentralizing the churches into independent organizations. During this time, the decision was made to close the Metro East church (Bellville) and for The South County church to merge with Bayless Baptist church to become The Journey Bayless in November 2022. 

In January 2023, Pastor Gilbert transitioned off staff to lead Faith Family Church in Shiloh, Illinois

Theology at the Bottleworks 

'Theology at the Bottleworks' is a monthly facilitated discussion group organized by members of The Journey. It is a monthly discussion that seeks to be a modern "public square," bringing people together from all views and perspectives, religious and irreligious, to discuss important topics of our times.

References

Further reading
 Taking Their Faith, but Not Their Politics, to the People
 STL Today

Churches in St. Louis
Evangelical churches in Missouri
Southern Baptist Convention churches